is a Japanese footballer currently playing as a midfielder for Fagiano Okayama.

Career statistics

Club
.

Notes

References

External links

1998 births
Living people
Japanese footballers
Association football midfielders
J2 League players
Fagiano Okayama players